Kiros may refer to:

 Kiros (band), a Canadian rock band 
 Kiros Seagill, a computer games character in Fantasy VIII

Ethiopian & Eritrean name
Kiros (Ge'ez: ኪሮስ) is a male given name of Ge'ez origin that may refer to:

 Kiros Alemayehu, an Ethiopian Tigrigna singer
 Aheza Kiros (born 1985), Ethiopian long-distance runner
 Kiros Asfaha, an Eritrean singer
 Kiros (footballer) (born 1988), Kiros Stanlley Soares Ferraz, brazilian footballer

Amharic-language names
Ethiopian given names